The Government of Saskatchewan refers to the provincial government of the province of Saskatchewan.  Its powers and structure are set out in the Constitution Act, 1867.

In modern Canadian use, the term "government" referred broadly to the cabinet of the day (formally the Executive Council of Saskatchewan), elected from the Legislative Assembly of Saskatchewan and the non-political staff within each provincial department or agency – that is, the civil service.

The Province of Saskatchewan is governed by a unicameral legislature, the Legislative Assembly of Saskatchewan, which operates in the Westminster system of government. The political party that wins the largest number of seats in the legislature normally forms the government, and the party's leader becomes premier of the province, i.e., the head of the government.

Lieutenant-Governor of Saskatchewan 

The functions of the Sovereign, Charles III, King of Canada, known in Saskatchewan as the King in Right of Saskatchewan, are exercised by the Lieutenant Governor of Saskatchewan. The Lieutenant Governor is appointed by the Governor General of Canada on the recommendation of the Prime Minister of Canada, in consultation with the Premier of Saskatchewan.

Executive powers 
Typically, although not necessarily, consisting of members of the Legislative Assembly, the Cabinet of Saskatchewan is similar in structure and role to the Cabinet of Canada. As federal and provincial responsibilities differ there are a number of different portfolios between the federal and provincial governments.

The lieutenant governor, as representative of the King, heads the council, and is referred to as the "Lieutenant Governor-in-Council". Other members of the Cabinet, who advise, or minister, the vice-regal, are selected by the premier and appointed by the lieutenant governor.

Legislative powers

The Legislative Assembly of Saskatchewan is the deliberative assembly of the Saskatchewan Legislature in the province of Saskatchewan, Canada. Bills passed by the assembly are given royal assent by the King in Right of Saskatchewan (represented by the Lieutenant Governor of Saskatchewan). The legislature meets at the Saskatchewan Legislative Building in Regina.

There are 61 constituencies in the province, which elect members of the Legislative Assembly (MLAs) to the Legislative Assembly. All are single-member districts, though the cities of Regina, Saskatoon and Moose Jaw have been represented by multi-member constituencies in the past.

The legislature has been unicameral since its establishment; there has never been a provincial upper house.

See also 
Politics of Saskatchewan
2020 Saskatchewan general election

References

External links 
 Government of Saskatchewan